The Ottoman Empire was represented by one athlete, Aleko Mulos, at the 1908 Summer Olympics in London, Britain. During the Olympics, the Ottoman Empire was referred to as Turkey. It was the first recognized appearance of the Ottoman State, though at least two athletes from Smyrna had previously competed for Greece in 1896.

Results by event

Gymnastics

References

Nations at the 1908 Summer Olympics
1908
Olympics
Sport in the Ottoman Empire